{{DISPLAYTITLE:C10H9N}}
The molecular formula C10H9N (molar mass: 143.19 g/mol, exact mass: 143.0735 u) may refer to:

 Benzazepine
 Lepidine, or 4-methylquinoline
 1-Naphthylamine
 2-Naphthylamine
 Quinaldine